XHCJZ-FM is a radio station on 105.1 FM in Ciudad Jiménez, Chihuahua, Mexico. The station is owned by Sigma Radio and carries the La Ke Buena grupera format from Radiópolis.

History
XHCJZ received its concession in 1994.

While the station's concession is held by Chavero Resendiz, who owns the Sigma Radio stations in Delicias, Chihuahua, until 2020, operation was conducted by Grupo Garza Limón, which primarily operates stations in Durango.

References

Radio stations in Chihuahua